Silvino Gomes Soares (born 1978-07-10) is a Cape Verdean football striker. 

He played for K.V. Red Star Waasland in Belgium. He previously played for FC Zwolle in the Netherlands.

He received his first call-up in May 2008 . He played one season for ASWH/

External links

1978 births
Living people
Cape Verdean footballers
Cape Verde international footballers
Portuguese people of Cape Verdean descent
PEC Zwolle players
ASWH players

Association footballers not categorized by position